Murray Allan Steele (born 16 July 1961) is a New Zealand cyclist. He competed in the sprint event at the 1984 Summer Olympics.

References

External links
 

1961 births
Living people
New Zealand male cyclists
Olympic cyclists of New Zealand
Cyclists at the 1984 Summer Olympics
People from Ranfurly, New Zealand
Commonwealth Games medallists in cycling
Commonwealth Games silver medallists for New Zealand
Commonwealth Games bronze medallists for New Zealand
Cyclists at the 1982 Commonwealth Games
20th-century New Zealand people
Medallists at the 1982 Commonwealth Games